Hatley is a municipality of about 771 people, in Memphrémagog Regional County Municipality in the Estrie region of Quebec, Canada. It lies to the south of the township municipality of the same name.

An otherwise quiet and tiny agricultural setting, one of Hatley's main claims to fame is its annual Canada Day Celebration which always takes place on July 1. Along with a parade (featuring horses, floats, antique cars, tractors, children on decorated bikes and any number of other entrants), the day includes games for children, artisan vendors, a book sale, community lunch, local performers, and ends off with a fireworks display.

Demographics

Population

Private dwellings occupied by usual residents: 340 (total dwellings: 472)

Language
Mother tongue (2021)

See also 
 List of municipalities in Quebec

References

External links

Municipalities in Quebec
Incorporated places in Estrie